The 1868 Birmingham by-election was held on 21 December 1868.  The by-election was held due to the incumbent Liberal MP John Bright, becoming President of the Board of Trade.  It was retained by Bright who was unopposed.

References

1868 elections in the United Kingdom
1868 in England
19th century in Birmingham, West Midlands
December 1868 events
By-elections to the Parliament of the United Kingdom in Birmingham, West Midlands constituencies
Unopposed ministerial by-elections to the Parliament of the United Kingdom in English constituencies